Hebeloma anthracophilum is a species of mushroom in the family Hymenogastraceae. It was first described as Agaricus birruss by Elias Fries in 1838.

See also
List of Hebeloma species

References

anthracophilum
Fungi described in 1910
Fungi of Europe
Taxa named by René Maire